Steven T. Rosen is the Provost and chief scientific officer of the  City of Hope National Medical Center in Duarte, California. 
In addition to directing City of Hope’s Comprehensive Cancer Center, Rosen leads the Beckman Research Institute at City of Hope, and the Irell & Manella Graduate School of Biological Sciences. Previously (1989-2014) Rosen was the director of the Robert H. Lurie Comprehensive Cancer Center at Northwestern University, which was awarded comprehensive cancer center status by the National Cancer Institute (NCI) in 1997.

In 2015 Rosen received a lifetime achievement award from the Israel Cancer Research Fund (ICRF) for his work in cancer research. 
His main areas of research involve the development of new treatments, particularly for Hematologic malignancies.

Education
Rosen received his bachelor's degree and medical degree with distinction (1976) from Northwestern University. He was a resident in Internal Medicine at Northwestern.  He was a fellow in Medical Oncology at the National Cancer Institute.

Career
Rosen joined City of Hope on March 1, 2014 as its first provost and chief scientific officer. City of Hope has been a Comprehensive Cancer Center since 1998.

Before joining City of Hope, Rosen worked at Northwestern University. He joined Northwestern University in 1981 as a junior faculty member. He was the director of Northwestern University’s Robert H. Lurie Comprehensive Cancer Center from 1989-2014, and the Genevieve Teuton professor of medicine at the Feinberg School of Medicine. Beginning in 1993, the center at Northwestern received National Cancer Institute (NCI)  funding as a designated cancer center in the United States. In 1997, it was awarded comprehensive cancer center status by NCI.

Major areas of focus for his research include 1) the mediation of cancer cell death by glucocorticoids in hematologic malignancies 2) the use of RNA-directed nucleoside analogs in  cancer therapy and 3) the role of proteins in cancer metabolism.  One of the nucleoside analogs he has worked on is in trials for the treatment of acute myeloid leukemia and chronic lymphocytic leukemia. Rosen has also worked to develop novel treatments for cutaneous lymphoma.

Rosen is the author of more than 450 publications in his field. He is editor-in-chief of the book series Cancer Treatment and Research and Oncology News International.

He has served on a number of boards, including the Board of Directors of 
the Leukemia & Lymphoma Society (2011-2014), 
the American Society of Clinical Oncology's Conquer Cancer Foundation and the Scientific Advisory Board of the Multiple Myeloma Research Foundation.

Rosen is an advocate for precision medicine and translational medicine.  
Under his leadership, City of Hope has partnered with the Translational Genomics Research Institute (TGen).
One of the initiatives he has promoted fosters international partnerships between City of Hope and hospitals and medical companies in countries such as China.

Other interests
Steven Rosen is married to Candice Polovina Rosen, and has four children.
 He has published a collection of poetry, Stolen moments.

Awards

 2019, Association of American Physicians
2018, American Institute for Medical and Biological Engineering
2017, Fellow of the American Society of Clinical Oncology
 2016, "Angel Award" for outstanding service to the Cancer community, Imerman Angels
 2015, Lifetime achievement award, Israel Cancer Research Fund (ICRF)
 2011, Man of Distinction Award, ICRF; Nov. 9, 2011 Declared Steven T. Rosen Day in Chicago
 1996, Women's Board of Northwestern Memorial Hospital for Compassionate Care
 1996, Marv Samuel Award, Chicago Baseball Cancer Charities
 1995, Martin Luther King Humanitarian Award, Northwestern Memorial Hospital 
 1994, Northwestern University Medical School Alumni Achievement Award
  America's Top Doctors® list, Castle Connolly Medical Ltd.
1976, Alpha Omega Alpha

References

American oncologists
Cancer researchers
Living people
Year of birth missing (living people)
City of Hope National Medical Center